Livigno Pass or Forcola di Livigno Pass is a high mountain pass in the Alps on the border between the canton of Graubünden in Switzerland and the Province of Sondrio in Italy.

It connects Bernina Pass in Switzerland with Livigno in Italy.

See also
 List of highest paved roads in Europe
 List of mountain passes
 List of the highest Swiss passes

Mountain passes of Switzerland
Mountain passes of Italy
Mountain passes of the Alps
Italy–Switzerland border crossings
Mountain passes of Graubünden
Poschiavo